Paralepas is a genus of goose barnacles in the  family Heteralepadidae.

Species
The World Register of Marine Species includes the following species in the genus :

 Paralepas americana Pilsbry, 1953
 Paralepas dannevigi (Broch, 1922)
 Paralepas distincta (Utinomi, 1949)
 Paralepas georgei Daniel, 1970
 Paralepas globosa Hiro, 1936
 Paralepas hygrosomi Zevina, 1981
 Paralepas intermedia (Hoek, 1907)
 Paralepas klepalae Kolbasov & Zevina, 1999
 Paralepas laxus Chan, 2009
 Paralepas lithotryae (Hoek, 1907)
 Paralepas maculata Utinomi, 1980
 Paralepas malaysiana (Annandale, 1905)
 Paralepas minuta (Philippi, 1836)
 Paralepas morula (Hoek, 1907)
 Paralepas nodulosa (Broch, 1922)
 Paralepas ovalis (Hoek, 1907)
 Paralepas palinuri (Barnard, 1924)
 Paralepas pedunculata (Hoek, 1883)
 Paralepas percarinata (Pilsbry, 1907)
 Paralepas phyllacanthusi Kim & Kim, 1988
 Paralepas quadrata (Aurivillius, 1894)
 Paralepas robusta Rosell, 1981
 Paralepas rosea (Hiro, 1938)
 Paralepas scutiger (Broch, 1922)
 Paralepas scyllarusi Utinomi, 1967
 Paralepas spinisegma Foster, 1981
 Paralepas tuberosa (Nilsson-Cantell, 1932)
 Paralepas typica Nilsson-Cantell, 1921
 Paralepas xenophorae (Annandale, 1906)

References

Barnacles